Massachusetts House of Representatives' 10th Middlesex district in the United States is one of 160 legislative districts included in the lower house of the Massachusetts General Court. It covers part of Middlesex County. Democrat John Lawn of Watertown has represented the district since 2011.

Locales represented
The district includes the following localities:
 part of Newton
 part of Waltham
 part of Watertown

The current district geographic boundary overlaps with those of the Massachusetts Senate's 1st Middlesex and Norfolk, 3rd Middlesex, and 2nd Suffolk and Middlesex districts.

Former locale
The district previously covered Brighton, circa 1872.

Representatives
 George M. Brooks, circa 1858 
 George W. Warren, circa 1859 
 Joseph H. Cannell, circa 1888 
 Frederick P. Glazier, circa 1920 
 Howard Symmes Russell, 1949–1954
 Eleanor M. Campobasso, 1965-1978 
 A. Joseph DeNucci
 Anthony Mandile
 Karen O'Donnell, 1993-1995
 Peter Koutoujian
 John J. Lawn, Jr., 2011-current

See also
 List of Massachusetts House of Representatives elections
 List of Massachusetts General Courts
 List of former districts of the Massachusetts House of Representatives
 Other Middlesex County districts of the Massachusetts House of Representatives: 1st, 2nd, 3rd, 4th, 5th, 6th, 7th, 8th, 9th, 11th, 12th, 13th, 14th, 15th, 16th, 17th, 18th, 19th, 20th, 21st, 22nd, 23rd, 24th, 25th, 26th, 27th, 28th, 29th, 30th, 31st, 32nd, 33rd, 34th, 35th, 36th, 37th

Images
Portraits of legislators

References

External links

 Ballotpedia
  (State House district information based on U.S. Census Bureau's American Community Survey).
 League of Women Voters of Waltham
 League of Women Voters of Newton

House
Government of Middlesex County, Massachusetts